The Black Hornet Nano is a military micro unmanned aerial vehicle (UAV) developed by Prox Dynamics AS of Norway, and in use by the armed forces of Norway, the United States, France, the United Kingdom, Germany, Ireland, Australia, the Netherlands, Poland, New Zealand, India, Turkey, South Africa and Algeria.

The drones measure around 16 × 2.5 cm (6 × 1 in) and provides troops on the ground with local situational awareness. They are small enough to fit in one hand and weigh 18 g (0.7 oz), with batteries. 

The UAV is equipped with a camera, which gives the operator video and still images. They were developed as part of a £20 million contract for 160 units with Marlborough Communications Ltd.

An operator can be trained to operate the Black Hornet in 20 minutes. It has three cameras; one looking forward, one straight down, and one pointing down at 45 degrees. A Black Hornet package contains two helicopters and, since a 90% charge is reached in 20–25 minutes, the same as its hovering time, when one needs to be recharged the other is ready to fly. Top speed is 21 km/h (13 mph).

In October 2014, Prox Dynamics unveiled a version of its PD-100 Black Hornet with night vision capabilities, with long-wave infrared and day video sensors that can transmit video or high-resolution still images via a digital data-link with a 1.6 km (1 mile) range.  Over 3,000 Black Hornets have been delivered as of 2014.

Operational history

The aircraft was being used by soldiers from the UK's Brigade Reconnaissance Force at Camp Bastion in Afghanistan. Operation Herrick personnel in Afghanistan deployed the Black Hornet from the front line to fly into enemy territory to take video and still images before returning to the operator. It was withdrawn from service in 2016/2017.

Designed to blend in with the muddy grey walls in Afghanistan, and capable of flying for 20 minutes on quiet electric motors, it has been used to look around corners or over walls and other obstacles to identify any hidden dangers and enemy positions. The Black Hornet is connected to the operator with a digital data-link and GPS. Images are displayed on a small handheld terminal, which can be used by the operator to control the UAV. 

The Black Hornet is launched from a small box that can be strapped to a utility belt, which also stores transmitted data, since the drone itself does not store any data, an advantage if captured.  Operators can steer the UAV or set waypoints for it to fly itself.

As of 25 October 2013, the British Army had 324 Hornet Nanos in service.

In July 2014, the United States Army Natick Soldier Research, Development and Engineering Center (NSRDEC) selected the PD-100 Black Hornet after looking at commercially available small-scale UAVs as part of the Cargo Pocket Intelligence, Surveillance, and Reconnaissance (CP-ISR) program.  It concluded that further refinements were needed for a U.S. Army role including reconfiguring the data-link, giving it night vision, and improving navigational capability. The Black Hornet was tested with U.S. troops at an event in early March 2015, and Prox Dynamics delivered a PD-100 with upgraded features for special forces testing in June 2015. 

By 2015, the Black Hornet had deployed with U.S. Marine Corps special operations teams. Although the Army is seeking a mini-drone for use by individual squads through the Soldier Borne Sensors (SBS) program, the individually handmade Black Hornet is seen as too expensive for large-scale deployment, with a unit costing as much as US$195,000.

Users
By September 2016, the PD-100 Black Hornet was in use by the militaries of 19 NATO-allied countries.
: National Security Guard
: Australian Army
: German Army
: Hellenic Army
: 21 Grup Gerak Khas of Malaysian Army
: Dutch Army
: New Zealand Special Air Service
: 104th Operational Maneuvers Regiment
: Indonesian Army
: Norwegian Armed Forces
: British Army, retired in 2016 after Operation Herrick. Reintroduced through the Defence Equipment and Support programme in April 2019 for research and development into a capability gap identified by British Army HQ for brigade-level unmanned reconnaissance.
: United States Marine Corps
United States: Lee County Sheriff’s Office
United States: United States Army Cavalry Scouts 
: French Armed Forces (including  the Special Operations Command)
: Spanish Armed Forces
: South African Police Service
: Turkish Land Forces, Special Forces Command (Turkey) & Gendarmerie General Command

: Armed Forces of Ukraine

References

Unmanned helicopters
Norwegian military aircraft
Post–Cold War military equipment of the United Kingdom
Unmanned military aircraft of the United Kingdom
Miniature helicopters